Nasrollahabad (also Romanized as Naşrollāhābād; also known as Naşrābād) is a village in Eslamabad Rural District, Sangar District, Rasht County, Gilan Province, Iran. At the 2006 census, its population was 353, in 113 families.

References 

Populated places in Rasht County